Mohamad Yasin Payapo (May 3 1956 - August 1, 2021) was an Indonesian politician.

Biography
He served as the Regent of West Seram from 2017 to till his death in 2021.

Payapo died from complications of COVID-19 during the COVID-19 pandemic in Indonesia at the age of 56.

References

1965 births
2021 deaths
Deaths from the COVID-19 pandemic in Indonesia
Regents of places in Indonesia
People from Maluku (province)